Super æ (sometimes written as Super Ae or Super Are) is the fifth studio album by Boredoms, released in 1998. It was named the 44th greatest album of the 1990s by Pitchfork.

Title
The correct pronunciation of the album's title is often debated, although according to The New Yorkers pop-music critic Sasha Frere-Jones, group frontman Yamantaka Eye has stated that the correct articulation of the "æ" symbol is simply "ah" or "ugh".

Critical reception

Ned Raggett of AllMusic gave the album 3 stars out of 5, saying: "Taking some more of the prog/Kraut influences that crept into earlier efforts while still firing up the amps all around, Eye and his cohorts (forming a core quintet this time around) once again become the most out-there band in the world." Writing for The New Rolling Stone Album Guide, Douglas Wolk gave the album 4 stars out of 5. He called it "a pounding, astounding psychedelic masterwork, the raw power of Boredoms' early records harnessed and directed into sustained riff-laden sun worship."

Track listing

Personnel
Credits adapted from liner notes.
 Yamantaka Eye – synthesizer, percussion, vocals, production, loops, electronics
 Hira – bass guitar, percussion, vocals
 Yamamoto Seiichi – guitar, vocals
 Yoshimi P-We – synthesizer, percussion, trumpet, vocals, Casio keyboard
 Atari – drums, samples, percussion
 EDA – drums, electronic percussion
 Masanobu Kondo – executive production
 Masayo Takise – mastering
 Kazvnori Akita – design

References

External links
 

1998 albums
Boredoms albums
Warner Music Japan albums
Birdman Records albums